Holy Family Church is a Catholic church in Petržalka, a district of Bratislava. It can seat 448. Construction began in July 2001 and the church was completed in 2003.

The church is located by the Croatian Canal near the Technopol building complex. It is located in a park where Pope John Paul II celebrated mass in 2003, now known as John Paul II Square.

In 2003, Pope John Paul II visited the church and celebrated the mass on the space in front of it. Tens of thousands of believers from all around Slovakia and neighbouring countries attended.

References

Roman Catholic churches in Bratislava
Roman Catholic churches completed in 2003
21st-century Roman Catholic church buildings in Slovakia